Rouba a.k.a. Roobz, is a soul singer/songwriter born in Lebanon and raised in the United Arab Emirates. She made her official debut into the music business in 2013 during Rolling Stone Magazine's fourth anniversary in the Middle East. The debut album entitled "Mama's Back" was entirely produced in Los Angeles by music producer Joe Kennedy.

Her first single "Don’t Go Home", released in July 2012, was named a "club-friendly slab of soulful pop" by Rolling Stone.

Early years
Rouba was born in Zahle, Lebanon on 22 May 1975 to father Maurice Zeidan, a businessman; and mother Salwa Zeidan, an artist, art curator and founder of the Salwa Zeidan Gallery based in the St. Regis Hotel in Abu Dhabi. Her parents' interest in music exposed Rouba to a large library of western music from a very early age. She began singing at the age of five, and her parents encouraged Rouba to pursue her love for music through private piano and guitar lessons.

Her family lived in between Lebanon and the UAE where they were mainly based for several years, constantly attempting to move back to Lebanon before having to evacuate due to the continuous political instability of the country.

She enrolled at the Universite St. Esprit in Kaslik, Lebanon where she studied music theory and classical vocal training. Her first live performance was at the age of 16 when she improvised to a twelve-bar blues jam. Dubbed the "Tracy Chapman of Lebanon", she continued to perform jazz and blues classics at live music venues around Lebanon. She also made a living recording voice-overs and jingles for TV commercials. In the early 90S she participated in a talent show called "Toute La Ville Chante et Danse" directed by Bassem Christo on LBC’s French channel C33 TV channel where she made it through to the finals and won second place in the female singer category.

Her musical journey led her to renowned Lebanese jazz composer and playwright Ziad Rahbani with whom she performed for several years before she took a long break from music in 1997.

Career diversion
While exploring music, Rouba also pursued an advertising degree at Notre Dame University in Lebanon. She later utilised her studies to venture into a career in public relations advertising and communication that entirely diverted her away from music. She moved to Dubai in the UAE in 1998, where she focused on climbing the corporate ladder and earned several senior roles and finally a regional position with Ogilvy & Mather, a multinational agency.

After abandoning music for more than a decade to pursue a successful her professional career in marketing and communication, Rouba finally revived her love for music and began performing live again at Musichall, Bar Louis, Blue Note and other live music venues in Beirut.  

Today, Rouba performs regularly and is actively promoting her original music in the Middle East region and around the world.

Music debut
As a Lebanese singer performing English jazz and blues covers, Rouba’s chances of landing a record deal were close to impossible and so she set off to produce her own album with the help of LA-based music producer Joe Kennedy. The move prompted the production of a dance single entitled "Don’t Go Home", released in July 2012. The collaboration continued with the production of Rouba's first album entitled 'Mama's Back' noting her return to music after a long absence. Rouba released the first single from the album in June 2013, a song called "Marrat" meaning "sometimes" in Arabic. This marked Rouba's first music video, which was produced in Dubai.

Rouba made her debut on the big stage in 2012 at Abu Dhabi’s Beats on the Beach as part of the Formula One Yasalam program for an audience of some 50,000 people, alongside international artists such as CeeLo Green and Missy Elliott.

Musical influences
Her influences stem from artists like Nina Simone, Marvin Gaye, Stevie Wonder, Mary J. Blige, India Arie, Maxwell, Jill Scott, Erykah Badu, the Brand New Heavies, Anita Baker and Rachelle Ferrell.

Discography
"Mama's Back" 2013
"Don't Go Home" 2012

Press
. Gulf News, Dubai, 7 February 2016
. "Al Arabiyah English" 21 July 2015
Interview. Timeout Abu Dhabi, 31 July 2012
November 2012, The National

References

1975 births
21st-century Lebanese women singers
Living people
People from Zahle